Rad Gumbo: The Complete Warner Bros. Years 1971-1990 is a 2014 collection recorded by Little Feat and released by Rhino/Warner Bros. Records.

Little Feat were an active group recording for Warner Bros Records from the first album, 1971's Little Feat through 1990's Representing the Mambo. Actively recording for a full decade during those first 20 years, and then inactive for most of those last ten years. 

The albums included in this collection are the eight albums Lowell George recorded with the band, the 1978 live album Waiting for Columbus represented by its 2002 2-disc expanded version, the 1981 compilation Hoy-Hoy! and the two comeback albums, 1988's Let It Roll and 1990's Representing the Mambo; and an edited version of the rarities disc from 2000's Hotcakes & Outtakes box is also included (the earliest previously released songs having been removed).

This collection represents the original group's core catalog and includes their successful return album in 1988 and 1990.

All the albums are presented as mini-LPs.

Notes 

Compilation albums by American artists
2014 compilation albums
Southern rock compilation albums
Little Feat albums